Air Commodore Peter Malam "Pete" Brothers,  (30 September 1917 – 18 December 2008) was a Royal Air Force fighter pilot and flying ace of World War II. Brothers was credited with 16 aerial victories, 10 of which he achieved during the Battle of Britain.

Early life
Born in Prestwich, Lancashire, the son of John Malam Brothers, Brothers was educated at North Manchester School. His early interest in flying was shown by learning to fly aged 16.  He joined the Royal Air Force in January 1936, and was granted a short service commission as an acting Pilot Officer on probation on 23 March, Joining No 32 Squadron in October 1936, his commission was confirmed on 27 January 1937, and he was promoted to flying officer on 27 October 1938.

Second World War
Brothers first saw action during the Battle of Britain as a flight commander in No 32. Squadron RAF which was then based at RAF Biggin Hill flying Hurricane aircraft.  The Battle of Britain was a very busy time for Brothers, and during this time he shot down his first enemy aircraft, a Messerschmitt Bf 109. By the end of August 1940, he was officially recognised as an ace, having shot down eight enemy aircraft. He was awarded the Distinguished Flying Cross for these actions; the citation read:

Brothers was promoted substantive Flight Lieutenant on 3 September 1940, and due to the level of losses within 32 Sqn, it was stood down, and on 9 September he was posted to No. 257 Squadron RAF based at RAF Coltishall on 9 September as a Flight Commander under Squadron Leader Robert Stanford Tuck. He was promoted Acting Squadron Leader in 1941 and took command of No. 457 Squadron RAAF in June 1941, and converted to the Spitfire aircraft. He was promoted temporary Squadron Leader on 1 December 1941. A year later when 457 Squadron returned to Australia, Brothers took command of No. 602 Squadron RAF.  He became wing leader of the Tangmere Wing in October 1942. He was awarded a Bar to his DFC on 15 June 1943:

and the DSO in 1944:

By 1945, Brothers had flown 875 operational hours and was credited with having shot down 16 enemy aircraft and damaged many more.  Despite his record, he was not offered a permanent commission so left the RAF in 1947 and joined the Colonial Service.

Post-war
After two years as a district officer in Kenya, Brothers applied to rejoin the RAF. He was commissioned as a Squadron Leader on 2 June 1949 (with seniority from 5 August 1946), and rather to his surprise was given command of a bomber squadron, No. 57 Squadron RAF, equipped with the Avro Lincoln bomber.  He held command from 1950 to 1952, which included the Malayan Emergency campaign (Operation Firedog). He was promoted Wing Commander on 2 July 1952, and after RAF Staff College, Andover he was appointed Wing Commander (Flying) at RAF Marham. There he joined the V bombers, flying the Vickers Valiant jet bombers.

Brothers was promoted to group captain on 1 January 1959, and to Air Commodore on 1 July 1966. After tours including Staff Officer at SHAPE, Director of RAF Operations (Overseas), Air Officer Commanding Military Air Traffic Operations and Director of Public Relations (RAF), he retired in 1973.  He was appointed Commander of the Order of the British Empire (CBE) in the 1964 Queen's Birthday Honours.

Post-RAF life
Brothers was best known for his Battle of Britain exploits and was the Chairman of the Battle of Britain Fighter Association for a number of years. He normally wore bright red socks. He died, aged 91, on 18 December 2008.

Brothers is remembered in a memorial, the ‘Spirit of The Few’ Monument, unveiled on 29 July 2022 at Hawkinge airfield. He is represented as one of seven bronze sculptures of No. 32 Squadron pilots, replicating a photograph taken of the men during the Battle of Britain.

References

External links
Brothers describing his attempts to boost the morale of the men he was leading – The Imperial War Museum 
Brothers at the final Sunset Ceremony at RAF Bentley Priory 20 July 2007
Brothers meeting Prince Charles and Duchess of Cornwall at RAF Bentley Priory 19 June 2007
Brothers laying the Battle of Britain Fighter Association wreath at the Battle of Britain London Monument 16 September 2006
Brothers at the unveiling of the Battle of Britain London Monument (to the left of Prince Charles) 18 September 2005
Imperial War Museum Interview

1917 births
2008 deaths
Military personnel from Lancashire
Royal Air Force air commodores
Commanders of the Order of the British Empire
Companions of the Distinguished Service Order
British World War II flying aces
Royal Air Force pilots of World War II
Royal Air Force personnel of the Malayan Emergency
People from Prestwich
The Few
Recipients of the Distinguished Flying Cross (United Kingdom)
Wing leaders